Luebo or Lwebo is a town (officially a commune) of Kasai Province in south-central Democratic Republic of the Congo. It is also the seat of the territory of the same name.  As of 2009 it had an estimated population of 40,115.

Transport
The town is on the N20 highway, and is served by Luebo Airport.

References

External links
 OpenStreetMap - Lwebo

Populated places in Kasaï Province